Shades of Gray is a 1989 novel by Carolyn Reeder about a boy named Will. At the end of the American Civil War, twelve-year-old Will, an orphan, is left to live with his aunt and uncle. He considers his uncle a traitor and a coward because he refuses to be a Confederate and take any part in the war at all. Gradually, Will learns the true meaning of courage.

Awards
1989 Scott O'Dell Award for Historical Fiction
ALA Notable Children's Book
1990 Jefferson Cup Award by the Virginia Library Association

References

1989 American novels
1989 children's books
Novels set during the American Civil War
Children's historical novels
American children's novels